Sherry is a town and unincorporated community in Wood County, Wisconsin, United States. The population was 809 at the 2000 census.

History
In June 1851 the six mile (10 km) square which later became the town of Sherry was surveyed by crews working for the U.S. government. They found the section corners with chain and compass and marked them. When done, the deputy surveyor filed this general description:
This Township is heavily Timbered with Maple Oak Birch & Pine Maple Oak & Birch being the prevailing Kinds - along the Border(?) of Mill Creek there is some good scattering Pine - along the Border(?) of the small stream (?) almost invariably(?) find alder thickets caused by Beaver dams. - the streams are fed by the swamp, and are subject to very sudden rise & fall - the soil is a dark loam is well adapted for the purpose of agriculture. the Surface is generally level & is covered with stone the stone being of a reddish color

A post office called Sherry was established in 1884, and remained in operation until 1968.

Sherry township was established in 1885, taking its name from the community located within its borders.

Sherry was platted in 1899, and named after Henry Sherry, proprietor of a local sawmill, and the owner of the Sherry Lumber Company which began operations around 1880.

Geography
According to the United States Census Bureau, the town has a total area of 35.4 square miles (91.6 km2), of which, 35.3 square miles (91.3 km2) of it is land and 0.1 square miles (0.3 km2) of it (0.34%) is water.

Demographics
As of the census of 2000, there were 809 people, 270 households, and 217 families residing in the town. The population density was 22.9 people per square mile (8.9/km2). There were 280 housing units at an average density of 7.9 per square mile (3.1/km2). The racial makeup of the town was 96.79% White, 0.25% Native American, 1.36% Asian, 0.49% from other races, and 1.11% from two or more races. Hispanic or Latino of any race were 0.99% of the population.

There were 270 households, out of which 44.4% had children under the age of 18 living with them, 70.7% were married couples living together, 5.9% had a female householder with no husband present, and 19.3% were non-families. 14.8% of all households were made up of individuals, and 4.1% had someone living alone who was 65 years of age or older. The average household size was 3.00 and the average family size was 3.36.

In the town, the population was spread out, with 30.8% under the age of 18, 8.7% from 18 to 24, 30.7% from 25 to 44, 20.6% from 45 to 64, and 9.3% who were 65 years of age or older. The median age was 35 years. For every 100 females, there were 103.8 males. For every 100 females age 18 and over, there were 105.9 males.

The median income for a household in the town was $52,143, and the median income for a family was $53,036. Males had a median income of $33,250 versus $25,341 for females. The per capita income for the town was $17,728. About 1.8% of families and 2.3% of the population were below the poverty line, including 1.9% of those under age 18 and 2.6% of those age 65 or over.

Notable people

 Herman Finger, entrepreneurial lumberman who worked for the Sherry Lumber Company
 Jacob J. Iverson, farmer, politician, and businessman, lived in the town
 Henry Sherry, the namesake of the town, and the owner of Henry Sherry House and the Sherry Lumber Company

References

External links
 1852 plat map of Sherry
1896 plat map
1909 plat map
1928 plat map
1928 plat map of Sherry Station
1956 plat map

Towns in Wood County, Wisconsin
Towns in Wisconsin
Unincorporated communities in Wood County, Wisconsin
Unincorporated communities in Wisconsin